Jarzombek is a surname and may refer to:

Bobby Jarzombek,  American heavy metal /progressive metal drummer 
Charlie Jarzombek, American racecar driver
Mark Jarzombek, American architectural historian, author and critic
Ron Jarzombek, American guitarist
Thomas Jarzombek (born 1973), German politician